The 2021 Great Ocean Road Open was a tournament on the 2021 ATP Tour, one of six events in the 2021 Melbourne Summer Series. It was played on outdoor hard courts in Melbourne, Australia. It was organised as a lead-up tournament to the 2021 Australian Open, and was held at the same venue, due to other tournaments in Australia being cancelled as a result of the COVID-19 pandemic. This tournament took place simultaneously with the 2021 Murray River Open and the 2021 ATP Cup, and was considered a relocation of the men's 2021 Adelaide International.

Points and prize money

Point distribution

Prize money

*per team

Singles main-draw entrants

Seeds

1 Rankings are as of January 25, 2021

Other entrants
The following players received wildcards into the main draw:
  Max Purcell
  Tristan Schoolkate
  John-Patrick Smith
  Dane Sweeny

The following players have been accepted directly into the main draw using a protected or a special ranking:
  Lu Yen-hsun
  Kamil Majchrzak

The following players received entry as an alternate:
  Matthew Ebden
  Thomas Fancutt
  Nam Ji-sung

Withdrawals 
Before the tournament
  Damir Džumhur → replaced by  Matthew Ebden
  Kyle Edmund → replaced by  Gianluca Mager
  Cristian Garín → replaced by  Yasutaka Uchiyama
  John Isner → replaced by  Andreas Seppi
  Ilya Ivashka → replaced by  Nam Ji-sung
  Steve Johnson → replaced by  Kamil Majchrzak
  Vasek Pospisil → replaced by  Thomas Fancutt

Retirements 
  Attila Balázs

Doubles main-draw entrants

Seeds

 Rankings are as of January 25, 2021.

Other entrants
The following pairs received wildcards into the doubles main draw:
  Robin Haase /  Sam Querrey
  Christopher O'Connell /  Aleksandar Vukic

The following pairs received entry as alternates into the doubles main draw:
  Roberto Carballés Baena /  Pablo Cuevas
  Tristan Schoolkate /  Dane Sweeny

Withdrawals 
Before the tournament
  Robin Haase /  Oliver Marach → replaced by  Scott Puodziunas /  Calum Puttergill
  Steve Johnson /  Sam Querrey → replaced by  Roberto Carballés Baena /  Pablo Cuevas
  Reilly Opelka /  Vasek Pospisil → replaced by  Tristan Schoolkate /  Dane Sweeny
During the tournament
  Hubert Hurkacz /  Jannik Sinner
  Miomir Kecmanović /  Karen Khachanov
  Max Purcell /  Jordan Thompson

Retirements 
  Nikoloz Basilashvili /  Andre Begemann
  Tristan Schoolkate /  Dane Sweeny

Champions

Singles

  Jannik Sinner def.  Stefano Travaglia, 7–6(7–4), 6–4

Doubles

  Jamie Murray /  Bruno Soares def.  Juan Sebastián Cabal /  Robert Farah, 6–3, 7–6(9–7)

References

External links

2021 ATP Tour
2021 in Australian tennis
Tennis tournaments in Australia
Tennis in Victoria (Australia)
Sport in Victoria (Australia)
February 2021 sports events in Australia